Evelin Kaufer (later Schmuck; born 22 February 1953, in Sohland an der Spree) is a retired East German sprinter who competed in the 100 metres.

At the 1972 Summer Olympics in Munich Kaufer reached the heats of the 100 m and won a silver medal in the 4 × 100 m relay with her teammates Christina Heinich, Bärbel Struppert and Renate Stecher.

Kaufer competed for the club SC Einheit Dresden during her active career. She married the DDR-Oberliga footballer Udo Schmuck.

References

1953 births
Living people
People from Bautzen (district)
People from Bezirk Dresden
East German female sprinters
Sportspeople from Saxony
Dresdner SC athletes
Olympic athletes of East Germany
Athletes (track and field) at the 1972 Summer Olympics
Olympic silver medalists for East Germany
Medalists at the 1972 Summer Olympics
Olympic silver medalists in athletics (track and field)
Olympic female sprinters